= Waihi Daily Telegraph =

Defunct New Zealand newspaper

The Waihi Daily Telegraph was a newspaper published in Waikato, New Zealand. It was published from 1901 to 1951. It replaced the Waihi Chronicle.
